Bryan Patrick Dechart (born March 17, 1987) is an American actor and Twitch streamer. He is known for his role as Connor in the video game Detroit: Become Human. He also played Eli Chandler on Jane by Design and has made appearances on Switched at Birth and True Blood.

Personal life
Dechart was born in Salt Lake City, Utah and raised outside Novi, Michigan. He went to Novi High School and graduated from the New York University Tisch School of the Arts with a BFA in acting. He married actress Amelia Rose Blaire on June 30, 2018.

Filmography

Film

Television

Web

Video games

Music videos

Awards

References

External links

1987 births
Living people
American male film actors
American male television actors
American male video game actors
American male voice actors
Male actors from Salt Lake City
Male feminists
People from Novi, Michigan
Tisch School of the Arts alumni
Twitch (service) streamers
21st-century American male actors